For the television series of the same name, see The Silver Theatre.

Silver Theater (sometimes written as Silver Theatre) was a radio dramatic anthology series in the United States. Originating in Hollywood, California, it was carried on CBS and on the Canadian Broadcasting Corporation. First broadcast October 3, 1937, its last broadcast was August 17, 1947.

Format

Drama
Originally, Silver Theater featured movie stars, primarily in original dramas and less often in adaptations of movies. Comedies were presented occasionally. In a reversal of the customary trend, some original dramas from Silver Theater were purchased for use in movies. In 1947, when the program was broadcast as a summer replacement series, radio stars—rather than those from movies—were used as leads.

Variety
In 1941, the Summer Silver Theater was a variety program, with Ed Sullivan as host and Will Bradley as bandleader. A guest star featured each week.

Personnel
By its nature, Hollywood Star Playhouse had no regular cast. Different movie stars of the era were featured, as indicated in the sampling of episodes and stars listed below. One continuing presence was that of the host, who was referred to as the "director" on the air. Conrad Nagel was the initial host. John Loder replaced him in the early 1940s. Announcers over the program's lifetime were John Conte, Dick Joy, Henry Charles, Roger Krupp, Jack Bailey, and Harry Bartell. Felix Mills directed the orchestra.

Selected episodes

Sponsor and promotions
The sponsor, International Silver Company, launched the program by inviting couples married 25 years or more to the CBS studio for the initial broadcast on October 3, 1937.

International Silver apparently chose well in selecting Silver Theater as a vehicle for advertising. The company's satisfaction with increased sales was such that CBS ran a four-page advertisement in the March 1, 1940, issue of Broadcasting magazine touting the advertising's effectiveness. The ad quoted comments from International Silver: "After thirteen weeks on CBS: 'We find we can paint a more alluring picture ... by radio than with the printed page.' ... After three years on CBS: '[S]ubstantial increase in sales for every year we have been on the air.'" As the ad continued, it noted that Silver Theater had become more popular over those three years and that "as the popularity of the program has increased, sales of 1847 Rogers Bros. have increased."

Concurrently, the International Silver Company advertised their 1847 Rogers Bros. silverware with advertisements in LIFE magazine including product endorsements by Hollywood actresses. Many also performed in the Silver Theater, including Judy Garland, Carole Lombard, Ginger Rogers, Rosalind Russell, and Loretta Young. Another brand of the company, International Sterling, also promoted the Silver Theater in LIFE magazine advertisements. 

CBS also produced a brochure "showing success of the Silver Theatre."

Adaptations
International Silver of Canada, counterpart of Silver Theater'''s sponsor, had its own version of the program (Summer Silver Theatre) on the CBC in 1941. The program "bore little resemblance to its American counterpart" and lasted for only 10 episodes.

See alsoBrownstone TheaterThe Cresta Blanca Hollywood PlayersThe Dreft Star PlayhouseEveryman's TheaterFamous Jury TrialsFour Star PlayhouseHollywood HotelHollywood Star PlayhouseHollywood Star Time (dramatic anthology)Mayor of the TownThe MGM Theater of the AirPhilip Morris PlayhouseStars over Hollywood (radio program)''

References

External links

Episodic Logs
 Episodic log of Silver Theater from Jerry Haendiges Vintage Radio Logs
 Episodic log of Silver Theater from radioGOLDINdex
 Episodic log of Silver Theater (and more) from The Digital Deli Too

Stories
 "Debutantes -- You Can Have Them," a story from Silver Theater, was printed in the August 1939 issue of Radio and Television Mirror.
 "Love's new sweet song," a story from Silver Theater, was printed in the January 1942 issue of Radio and Television Mirror.
 "Stronger than Steel," a story from Silver Theater, was printed in the December 1941 issue of Radio and Television Mirror.

Streaming audio
 Episodes of Silver Theater from Internet Archive
 Episodes of Silver Theater from Old Time Radio Researchers Group

1930s American radio programs
1940s American radio programs
American radio dramas
CBS Radio programs
Radio programs adapted into television shows